Looney Tunes Golden Collection: Volume 3 is a DVD box set from Warner Home Video that was released on October 25, 2005. It contains 60 Looney Tunes and Merrie Melodies theatrical short subject cartoons, nine documentaries, 32 commentary tracks from animators and historians, 11 "vintage treasures from the vault", and 11 music-only or music-and-sound-effects audio tracks.

Volume 3 is the first in the series to have a disclaimer on the box art stating that the set "is intended for the adult collector" and may not be suitable for younger audiences. It is also the first to feature a warning, given by Whoopi Goldberg, a fan of the Warner Bros. cartoon characters, who tells the viewers that some of the cartoons on the set contain content that is  politically incorrect by today's standards, but will be shown uncut for historical reasons, because "removing these inexcusable images and jokes from this collection would be the same as saying [these prejudices] never existed". Future volumes also contain this warning, which is presented instead as a title card before the main menu.

Related releases
As with Volumes 1 and 2, the individual discs were released separately in Regions 4:
 Disc 1: Best of Bugs Bunny - Volume 3
 Disc 2: not released
 Disc 3: Best of Porky - Volume 2 
 Disc 4: All-Stars - Volume 4 

The Region 4 versions have changed package of contents.
 Disc 1: Best of Bugs Bunny - Volume 3 includes the short Super-Rabbit from Disc 4: All-Stars - Volume 4 replacing shorts Rebel Rabbit and Duck! Rabbit! Duck!
 Disc 3: Best of Porky - Volume 2 includes the shorts Hollywood Capers and The Film Fan from Disc 2 replacing shorts Porky's Romance, Porky's Party and Porky in Egypt
 Disc 4: All-Stars - Volume 4 includes the shorts The CooCoo Nut Grove, She Was an Acrobat's Daughter, The Honey-Mousers and The Last Hungry Cat from Disc 2 replacing shorts Super-Rabbit, Daffy Duck and Egghead, A Gruesome Twosome, An Itch in Time and Gonzales' Tamales

In the UK (Region 2), the set was released unchanged in 2006.

Disc 1 - Bugs Bunny Classics
All cartoons on this disc star Bugs Bunny.

Special features

Audio bonuses
 Music-and-effects-only audio tracks on Duck! Rabbit, Duck! and Hillbilly Hare
 Audio commentary
 Jerry Beck and Martha Sigal on The Wabbit Who Came to Supper
 Michael Barrier on Bowery Bugs and Hillbilly Hare
 Greg Ford on Case of the Missing Hare
 Eddie Fitzgerald and John Kricfalusi on Wackiki Wabbit
 Eric Goldberg on Duck! Rabbit, Duck!

From the Vaults
 Chuck Amuck: 1991 Documentary
 The Bugs Bunny Show: The Honey-Mousers bridging sequences; Ball Point Puns audio recording sessions with Mel Blanc

Behind-the-Tunes
 A-Hunting We Will Go: Chuck Jones' Wabbit Season Twilogy: A look at the creation, comedy, and cultural influence of "The Hunter's Trilogy", three cartoons ("Rabbit Fire", "Rabbit Seasoning", and "Duck! Rabbit! Duck!") in which Daffy sets up Bugs to be shot by Elmer and the two argue over what hunting season it is (only for Daffy to get shot every time).

Disc 2 - Hollywood Caricatures and Parodies

Special features

Audio bonuses
 Music-only audio track on Wideo Wabbit and The Honey-Mousers
 Music-and-effects-only audio track on The Last Hungry Cat
 Audio commentaries
 Jerry Beck and Martha Sigall on Hollywood Capers
 Michael Barrier on The Coo-Coo Nut Grove
 Greg Ford on She Was an Acrobat's Daughter, Thugs with Dirty Mugs, and The Mouse That Jack Built with pre-score music
 Daniel Goldmark on Swooner Crooner
 June Foray and Jerry Beck on The Honey-Mousers

From the Vaults
 What's Up, Doc? A Salute to Bugs Bunny: Part 1 (Turner Pictures, 1990), which contains the following shorts:
 A Wild Hare (1940) (unrestored, but with recreated titles)
 The Heckling Hare (1941)
 The Big Snooze (1946)
 Sinkin' in the Bathtub (1930)
 It's Got Me Again! (1932)

Behind-the-Tunes
 Fine Tooning: Restoring the Warner Bros. Cartoons: A look at how the Warner Bros. cartoons are digitally restored for the Golden Collection DVD sets.
 Bosko, Buddy and the Best of Black and White: A look at the very early Warner Bros. shorts, which either starred Bosko, Buddy, or were thinly-plotted animated music videos based on music from Warner Bros. music library at the time.

Disc 3 - Porky and the Pigs

Special features

Audio bonuses
 Music-only audio tracks on Robin Hood Daffy, Rocket Squad
 Music-and-effects-only audio track on The Windblown Hare, Claws for Alarm
 Audio commentaries
 Jerry Beck on I Haven't Got a Hat
 Mark Kausler on Porky's Romance
 Eddie Fitzgerald and John Kricfalusi on Porky's Party, Claws for Alarm
 Daniel Goldmark on Pigs in a Polka
 Joe Dante on Porky Pig's Feat
 Eric Goldberg on Robin Hood Daffy
 Paul Dini on Rocket Squad

From the Vaults
 What's Up, Doc? A Salute to Bugs Bunny: Part 2 (Turner Pictures, 1990), which contains the following shorts:
 Hair-Raising Hare (1946)
 Hare Trigger (1945) (unrestored)
  The Bear That Wasn't (1967; MGM cartoon directed by Chuck Jones),
 Point Rationing of Foods (1943)
 Porky's Party Storyboard Reel

Behind-the-Tunes
 Tish Tash: The Animated World of Frank Tashlin: A look at the life and animated work of director Frank Tashlin.

Disc 4 - All-Stars Cartoon Party

Special features

Audio bonuses 
 Music-only audio tracks on Gonzales' Tamales and Birds Anonymous
 Audio commentaries
 Paul Dini on Super-Rabbit
 John Kricfalusi on A Gruesome Twosome
 Milton Gray on A Gruesome Twosome
 Eddie Fitzgerald and John Kricfalusi on Draftee Daffy
 John Kricfalusi and Bill Melendez on Falling Hare and An Itch in Time
 Jerry Beck and Art Leonardi on Birds Anonymous and Gonzales' Tamales
 Greg Ford on No Barking and To Beep or Not to Beep
 Michael Barrier on Odor-able Kitty and Walky Talky Hawky

From the Vaults
 Private Snafu cartoons: Spies (1943), Rumors (1943), Snafuperman (1943)
 Falling Hare Storyboard Reel
 TV pilot: Philbert (Three's a Crowd) (1963) - with optional commentary by Jerry Beck and Art Leonardi

Behind-the-Tunes
 The Charm of Stink: On the Scent of Pepé Le Pew: A look at Chuck Jones' amorous skunk character, Pepe Le Pew
 Looney Tunes Go to War!: A look at the outrageous (and often offensive) cartoons released by Warner Bros. studios during World War II.
 Strictly for the Birds: Tweety and Sylvester's Award-Winning Teamup: A look at how Sylvester and Tweety's pairing led to Friz Freleng winning the Oscar for the 1957 short Birds Anonymous.

Reception
In The New York Sun, author and critic Gary Giddins had complained that Looney Tunes Golden Collection: Volume 1 and Looney Tunes Golden Collection: Volume 2 were lacking in black-and-white shorts, and seemed to avoid the more politically incorrect cartoons in the series. When his review was reprinted in the book, Natural Selection: Gary Giddins on Comedy, Film, Music, and Books, Giddins noted that Volume 3 made up for its forerunners' shortcomings by including some of the racial caricatures of the series, preceded by an explanatory introduction by Whoopi Goldberg.

External links

See also
 Looney Tunes and Merrie Melodies filmography
 Looney Tunes and Merrie Melodies filmography (1929–1939)
 Looney Tunes and Merrie Melodies filmography (1940–1949)
 Looney Tunes and Merrie Melodies filmography (1950–1959)
 Looney Tunes and Merrie Melodies filmography (1960–1969)
 Looney Tunes and Merrie Melodies filmography (1970–present and miscellaneous)

References

Looney Tunes home video releases